Cotton Edmunds is a former civil parish, now in the parish of Christleton, in the borough of Cheshire West and Chester and ceremonial county of Cheshire in England. In 2001 it had a population of 25. The civil parish was abolished in 2015 and merged into Christleton.

See also

Listed buildings in Cotton Edmunds

References

External links

Former civil parishes in Cheshire
Cheshire West and Chester